Coleophora alnifoliae is a moth of the family Coleophoridae. It is found in Europe, from Fennoscandia to the Pyrenees, Sardinia, Italy and Romania and from Great Britain to the Baltic States and Poland. It is also known from North America.

The wingspan is 12–13 mm. The moth flies from July to August depending on the location.

The larvae feed on alder,  creating a slender, brown spatulate leaf case, in the end about 13 mm long. The mouth angle is about 15°. Larvae appear in September and feed to the end of October, making two youth cases in this period, then go into hibernation. They resume feeding in May and make their final case, in which they pupate around June. In Britain, the larvae often hibernate a second time.

External links
 
 Coleophora alnifoliae at UKmoths
 Plant Parasites of Europe

alnifoliae
Moths described in 1934
Moths of Europe
Moths of North America